The Southern Cross Rally was a major international rally mainly held in the Port Macquarie region of New South Wales, Australia, between 1966 and 1980. The rally attracted many of the world's leading rally drivers and factory teams.

The inaugural Southern Cross Rally was won by Harry Firth in a works Ford Cortina. Scotsman Andrew Cowan dominated the event in the 1970s winning the rally five years in a row for the Mitsubishi works team from 1972 to 1976. The last four wins were in a Mitsubishi Lancer 1600 GSR and Cowan had also earlier won the 1969 'Cross in an Austin 1800 making a total of six victories.

Some other notable Southern Cross winners were Colin Bond in a Holden Dealer Team Torana GTR XU-1 in 1971, the 'flying Finn' Rauno Aaltonen in a Datsun Violet 710 in 1977, Talmalmo farmer George Fury in 1978 and 1979 in the Datsun Stanza and Ross Dunkerton who won the 1980 rally driving a Stanza.

There were many famous international rally drivers who contested the rally without winning it, including world champions Swedes Björn Waldegård and Stig Blomqvist, and Finns Ari Vatanen and Hannu Mikkola. Some other notable international rally drivers who competed include Edgar Herrmann, Timo Mäkinen, Shekhar Mehta and Paddy Hopkirk.

The final Southern Cross Rally in 1980 was a hard-fought battle between the Datsun Stanzas of Dunkerton, Fury and Geoff Portman and the Ford Escort BDA's driven by Greg Carr and Ari Vatanen. Dunkerton held off the Escorts to win. A combination of lack of sponsorship money and 'burn-out' of the rally organisers led to the demise of what was still a very competitive event.

Winners

References
 AMSAG - History of the Southern Cross Rally
 Australian Competition Yearbook 1977

External links
Southern Cross Rally Roll of Honour

Rally competitions in Australia
Motorsport competitions in Australia
Sport in New South Wales
Motorsport in New South Wales